Anapistula is a genus of dwarf orb-weavers that was first described by Carl Eduard Adolph Gerstaecker in 1941.

Species
 it contains twenty-five species, found in North America, the Caribbean, Africa, Oceania, Asia, South America, and Portugal:
Anapistula appendix Tong & Li, 2006 – China
Anapistula aquytabuera Rheims & Brescovit, 2003 – Brazil
Anapistula ataecina Cardoso & Scharff, 2009 – Portugal
Anapistula australia Forster, 1959 – Australia (Queensland)
Anapistula ayri Rheims & Brescovit, 2003 – Brazil
Anapistula bebuia Rheims & Brescovit, 2003 – Brazil
Anapistula benoiti Forster & Platnick, 1977 – Congo
Anapistula bifurcata Harvey, 1998 – Australia (Northern Territory)
Anapistula boneti Forster, 1958 – Mexico
Anapistula caecula Baert & Jocqué, 1993 – Ivory Coast
Anapistula cuttacutta Harvey, 1998 – Australia (Northern Territory)
Anapistula equatoriana Dupérré & Tapia, 2017 – Ecuador
Anapistula guyri Rheims & Brescovit, 2003 – Brazil
Anapistula ishikawai Ono, 2002 – Japan
Anapistula jerai Harvey, 1998 – Malaysia, Indonesia (Kalimantan, Krakatau), Borneo
Anapistula orbisterna Lin, Pham & Li, 2009 – Vietnam
Anapistula panensis Lin, Tao & Li, 2013 – China
Anapistula pocaruguara Rheims & Brescovit, 2003 – Brazil
Anapistula secreta Gertsch, 1941 (type) – USA to Colombia, Bahama Is., Jamaica
Anapistula seychellensis Saaristo, 1996 – Seychelles
Anapistula tonga Harvey, 1998 – Tonga
Anapistula troglobia Harvey, 1998 – Australia (Western Australia)
Anapistula ybyquyra Rheims & Brescovit, 2003 – Brazil
Anapistula yungas Rubio & González, 2010 – Argentina
Anapistula zhengi Lin, Tao & Li, 2013 – China

See also
 List of Symphytognathidae species

References

Araneomorphae genera
Cosmopolitan spiders
Symphytognathidae